Silvia Kristoffersen Kosmo (born 30 March 1977) is a Norwegian politician for the Labour Party.

She served in the position of deputy representative to the Norwegian Parliament from Vestfold in the term 2005–2009, meeting as a regular representative from December 2006 after Dag Terje Andersen was appointed to the Cabinet.

References

1977 births
Living people
Labour Party (Norway) politicians
Women members of the Storting
Members of the Storting
21st-century Norwegian politicians
21st-century Norwegian women politicians